Tralee Dynamos A.F.C. is an Irish association football club based in Tralee, County Kerry. Their senior team currently plays in the Kerry District League. They have previously fielded teams in the League of Ireland U19 Division, the A Championship, the Munster Senior League and the Limerick Desmond League.

History

Early years
According to the club crest, Tralee Dynamos were founded in 1961. 
Limerick Desmond League in 1955. Other founder members of this league included Newcastle West A.F.C. 
In 1971 Tralee Dynamos and Killarney Athletic left the Desmond League to become founder members of the Kerry District League.
Tralee Dynamos were the inaugural champions of the KDL and subsequently became the league's most successful team. In 1997–98 the club won its first national trophy when they won the FAI Youth Cup defeating Stella Maris in the final. In 1999–2000 the club also entered a team in the Munster Senior League.

A Championship
Between 2009 and 2011, Tralee Dynamos played in the A Championship.

 They were the first and to date so far, the only association football club from County Kerry to play in a senior national level league. They made their A Championship debut on 5 April 2009 with a 1–0 defeat against Sporting Fingal A. Following the collapse of the A Championship, Tralee Dynamos applied to join League of Ireland First Division for the 2012 season. However this was unsuccessful and their senior team subsequently rejoined the Kerry District League. They also entered a team in the League of Ireland U19 Division.

Honours
Kerry District League
Winners: 1971–72, 1972–73, 1982–83, 1983–84, 1984–85, 1986–87, 1989–90, 1990–91, 1991–92, 1992–93, 1993–94, 1994–95, 2002–03, 2003–04, 2004–05, 2014–15 : 16
FAI Youth Cup
Winners: 1997–98: 1

See also 
 Kerry FC

References

 
Association football clubs in County Kerry
Dynamos
Association football clubs established in 1961
A Championship teams
1961 establishments in Ireland
Former Munster Senior League (association football) clubs